Thomas Frewen may refer to:

 Thomas Frewen (physician) (1704–1791), English physician from Sussex
 Thomas Frewen (MP) (1630–1702), MP for Rye

See also 
 Frewen (disambiguation)